Andrew "Drew" Lasker (born November 20, 1982) is an American professional basketball player who played for the Newcastle Eagles in the British Basketball League (BBL).

Born in Katy, Texas, he attended Point Loma Nazarene University from 2002 to 2004. He began his basketball career in 2004 with the touring Athletes in Action team, an evangelical Christian sports ministry. In 2005, Lasker turned professional by signing for leading British team Plymouth Raiders and has since played for Newcastle Eagles. Known most notably for playing for the Guildford Heat, which Lasker states is his favourite club of all time.

At the start of the 2020–21 season, he launched and co-hosted 'The BBL Show', with former teammate and Plymouth Raiders Head Coach Jay Marriott, the official podcast of the British Basketball League.

References

1982 births
Living people
American expatriate basketball people in the United Kingdom
American men's basketball players
Basketball players at the 2018 Commonwealth Games
Basketball players from Texas
Surrey Scorchers players
Newcastle Eagles players
People from Katy, Texas
Plymouth Raiders players
Point Loma Nazarene Sea Lions men's basketball players
Sportspeople from Harris County, Texas
Commonwealth Games competitors for England
American expatriate sportspeople in England
Naturalised citizens of the United Kingdom